Roberto Savio (born in Rome, Italy, but also holding Argentine nationality) is a journalist, communication expert, political commentator, activist for social and climate justice  and advocate of global governance. He has spent most of his career with Inter Press Service (IPS), the news agency which he founded in 1964 along with Argentine journalist Pablo Piacentini.

Savio studied Economics at the University of Parma, followed by post-graduate courses in Development Economics under Gunnar Myrdal, History of Art and International Law in Rome. He started his professional career as a research assistant in International Law at the University of Parma.

Early activities

While at university, Roberto Savio acted as an international officer with Italy’s National Student Association and the Youth Movement of Italy’s Christian Democracy party, eventually taking on responsibility for Christian Democracy’s relations with developing countries. After leaving university, he became international press chief for former Italian Prime Minister Aldo Moro. After the 1973 Chilean coup d’etat, Roberto Savio left Italian politics to pursue journalism.

Early journalistic career

Roberto Savio’s career in journalism began with Italian daily ‘Il Popolo’ and he went on to become Director for News Services for Latin America with RAI, Italy’s state broadcasting company. He received a number of awards for TV documentaries, including the Saint-Vincent Award for Journalism, the most prestigious journalism award in Italy.

Inter Press Service (IPS)

Throughout his student years, Roberto Savio had cultivated an interest in analysing and explaining the huge information and communication gap that existed between the North and the South of the world, particularly Latin America. Together with Argentine journalist Pablo Piacentini, he decided to create a press agency that would permit Latin American exiles in Europe to write about their countries for a European audience.

That agency, which was known in the early days as Roman Press Agency, was the seed for what was to become the Inter Press Service (IPS) news agency, which was formally established at a meeting in the Schloss Eichholz conference centre of the Konrad Adenauer Foundation (the foundation of the CDU), in Wesseling near Bonn, then the capital city of West Germany.

From the outset, it was decided that IPS would be a non-profit cooperative of journalists and its statute declared that two-thirds of the members should come from the South.

Roberto Savio gave IPS its unique mission – “giving a voice to the voiceless” – acting as a communication channel that privileges the voices and the concerns of the poorest and creates a climate of understanding, accountability and participation around development, promoting a new international information order between the South and the North.

The agency grew rapidly throughout the 1970s and 1980s until the dramatic events of 1989-91 – the fall of the Berlin Wall and the collapse of the Soviet Union – prompted new goals and definitions: IPS was the first news outlet to identify itself as “global” and define the new concept of neoliberal globalisation as contributing to the distancing of developing countries from wealth, trade and policy-making.

IPS offers communication services to improve South–South cooperation and South-North exchanges and carries out projects with international partners to open up communication channels to all social sectors.

IPS has been recognised by the United Nations and granted NGO consultative status (category I) with ECOSOC.

With the strengthening of the process of globalisation, IPS has dedicated itself to global issues, becoming the news agency for global civil society: more than 30,000 NGOs subscribe to its services, and several million people are readers of its online services.

Under Roberto Savio, IPS won the Washington-based Population Institute’s “most conscientious news service” award nine time in the 1990s, beating out the major wire services year in and year out.

IPS won FAO’s A.H. Boerma Award for journalism in 1997  for its "significant contribution to covering sustainable agriculture and rural development in more than 100 countries, filling the information gap between developed and developing countries by focusing on issues such as rural living, migration, refugees and the plight of women and children".

On the initiative of Roberto Savio, IPS established the International Journalism Award in 1985 to honour outstanding journalists whose efforts, and often lives, contributed significantly to exposing human rights violations and advancing democracy, most often in developing countries. In 1991, the scope of the award was broadened to reflect the tremendous changes taking place in the world following the historic break-up of the Soviet Union and the end of the Cold War. The Award, renamed the International Achievement Award, was given in recognition of the work of individuals and organisations that “continue to fight for social and political justice in the new world order”.

Roberto Savio is now President Emeritus of IPS and Chairman of the IPS Board of Trustees, which also includes former U.N. Secretary-General Boutros Boutros-Ghali, former Portuguese President Mario Soares, former UNESCO Director-General Federico Mayor Zaragoza, former Finnish President and Nobel Peace Prize laureate Martti Ahtisaari, former Costa Rican President and Nobel Peace Prize laureate Oscar Arias and former Japanese Prime Minister Toshiki Kaifue.

After stepping down as Director-General of IPS, Roberto Savio has continued his interest in “alternative” communication and information, founding Other News as an international non-governmental association of people concerned about the decline of the information media.

Other News

In 2008, Roberto Savio launched the online Other News service to provide “information that markets eliminate”.

Other News publishes reports that have already appeared in niche media but not in mass circulation media, in addition to opinions and analyses from research centres, universities and think tanks – material that is intended to give readers access to news and opinion that they will not find in their local newspapers but which they might wish to read “as citizens who care about a world free from the pernicious effects of today’s globalisation”.

Other News also distributes daily analysis on international issues, particularly the themes of global governance and multilateralism, to several thousand policy-makers and leaders of civil society, in both English and Spanish.

Communication initiatives

An internationally renowned expert in communications issues, Roberto Savio has helped launched numerous communication and information projects, always with an emphasis on the developing world.

Among others, Roberto Savio helped launch the National Information Systems Network (ASIN) for Latin America and the Caribbean,  the UNESCO-sponsored Agencia Latinoamericana de Servicios Especiales de Informacion [Latin American Special Information Services Agency] (ALASEI), and the Women’s Feature Service (WFS), initially an IPS service and now an independent NGO with headquarters in New Delhi.

He also founded the Technological Information Promotion System (TIPS), a major U.N. project to implement and foster technological and economic cooperation among developing countries, and he developed Women into the New Network for Entrepreneurial Reinforcement (WINNER), a TIPS training project aimed at educating and empowering small and medium woman entrepreneurs in developing countries. The activities of TIPS are currently carried by the executing agency, Development Information Network (DEVNET), an international association which Roberto Savio helped create and which has been recognised by the United Nations as an NGO holding consultative status (category I) with the U.N. Economic and Social Council (ECOSOC).

Roberto Savio has also been actively involved in promoting exchanges between regional information services, such as between ALASEI and the Organisation of Asian News Agencies (OANA) now known as the Organisation of Asia-Pacific News Agencies, and between the PanAfrican News Agency (PANA) and the Federation of Arab News Agencies (FANA).

Roberto Savio was instrumental in placing the concept of a Development Press Bulletin Service Tariff on the agenda of UNESCO’s International Commission for the Study
of Communication Problems (MacBride Commission).

Roberto Savio has also worked closely in the field of information and communication with many United Nations organisations, including the United Nations Development Programme (UNDP), the United Nations Environment Programme (UNEP), the United Nations Educational, Scientific and Cultural Organisation (UNESCO), the United Nations Population Fund (UNFPA), the United Nations Children’s Fund (UNICEF) and the United Nations Institute for Training and Research (UNITAR).

Achievements and awards

In 1970, Roberto Savio received the Saint-Vincent Award for Journalism, the most prestigious journalism award in Italy, for a five-part series on Latin America which was recognised as “best TV transmission”.

He was awarded the Hiroshima Peace Award in 2013 for his “contribution towards the construction of a century of peace by ‘giving voice to the voiceless’ through Inter Press Service for nearly five decades”. The award was established by Soka Gakkai, a lay Buddhist organisation based in Tokyo.

He received the Joan Gomis Memorial Award (Catalunya) for Journalism for Peace in 2013.

In October 2016, during the 31st Festival of Latin American Cinema in Trieste, Italy, Roberto Savio received the "Salvador Allende" award, given to honour a personality from the world of culture, art or politics who actively supported the conservation of Latin America's rich history and culture.

In 2019, he received a special diploma from the President of Chile, Michelle Bachelet, for his role of solidarity during the Chilean military dictatorship.
He was appointed by President of the Republic Mattarella, one of the twelve Knights of the Order of Merit of the Italian Republic for 2021. He also received an honorary degree in political science from the United Nations Peace University in 2021.

Advisory activities

Roberto Savio served as Senior Adviser for Strategies and Communication to the Director General of the International Labour Organization (ILO) from 1999 to 2003. He also served as an internal communication consultant to Catherine Bertini, Executive Director of the World Food Programme (WFP), in 2000.

Affiliations

From 1999 to 2003, Roberto Savio was a board member of the Training Centre for Regional Integration, based in Montevideo, Uruguay.

After several years as a member of the Governing Council of the Society for International Development (SID), the world’s oldest international civil society development organisation, he was elected Secretary-General for three terms, and is now the organisation’s Secretary-General Emeritus.

Roberto Savio was founder and President of Indoamerica, an NGO that promotes education in poor areas of Argentina suffering from social breakdown.

He has been a member of the International Committee of the World Social Forum (WSF) since it was established in 2001, a member of the International Council and was elected as Coordinator of the ‘Media, Culture and Counter-Hegemony’ thematic area at WSF 2003.

Roberto Savio is co-founder of Media Watch International, based in Paris, of which he is Secretary General.

Until 2009, Roberto Savio was Chairman of the Board of the Alliance for a New Humanity, an international foundation established in Puerto Rico, which has been promoting the culture of peace since 2001 and whose Board includes thinker Deepak Chopra, Spanish judge Balthazar Garzon, Nobel prize winners Oscar Arias and Betty Williams, and philanthropists Ray Chambers, Solomon Levis and Howard Rosenfield. He is now a member of the Board.

He is Deputy Director of the Scientific Council of the New Policy Forum (formerly the World Policy Forum), founded by Mikhail Gorbachev and based in Luxembourg, to provide a space for reflection and new thinking on the current international situation by influential global leaders.

Roberto Savio is responsible for international relations of the European Centre for Peace and Development, based in Belgrade, whose mission is to contribute to peace and development in Europe and to international cooperation in the transfer of knowledge based on the premise that development under conditions of peace is only possible when conceived as human development.

Roberto Savio is Chairman of Accademia Panisperna, a cultural meeting space in the centre of Rome, and is President of Arcoiris TV, an online TV channel with the world’s largest collection of videos and registrations of political and cultural events (over 70,000 hours), based in Modena, Italy.

In 2016, Roberto Savio started contributing on a monthly basis to the Wall Street International Magazine with an economical and political column.

Films and publications

In 1972, Roberto Savio produced a three-part documentary on Che Guevara titled ‘Che Guevara – Inchiesta su un mito’ (Che Guevara – Investigation of a Myth), and has also produced five films, two of which were presented at the Venice and Cannes film festivals.

Roberto Savio has published several books, including ‘Verbo America’ together with Alberto Luna (1990), which deals with the cultural identity of Latin America, and ‘The Journalists Who Turned the World Upside Down’ (2012), which has been published in three languages (English, Italian and Spanish),  is a collection of narratives by over 100 IPS journalists and key global players, including Nobel Peace Prize laureates, who have supported the agency. It looks at information and communication as key elements in changes to the old post-Second World War and post-Cold War worlds. It provides an insight into the idealism that fired many of those who worked for the agency as well as the high esteem in which it was held by many prominent figures in the international community.

In October 2016, Roberto Savio presented the first Other News publication: “Remembering Jim Grant: Champion for Children”, an online edition of the book dedicated to Jim Grant, UNICEF Executive Director 1980-1995, who saved 25 million children

Current activities

Roberto Savio is currently engaged in a campaign for the governance of globalisation and social and climate justice, which takes him as a speaker to numerous conferences worldwide, and about which he produces a continuous stream of articles and essays.

He is Deputy Director of the Scientific Council of the New Policy Forum (formerly the World Policy Forum), founded by Mikhail Gorbachev and based in Luxembourg, to provide a space for reflection and new thinking on the current international situation by influential global leaders.

Roberto Savio is responsible for international relations of the European Centre for Peace and Development, based in Belgrade, whose mission is to contribute to peace and development in Europe and to international cooperation in the transfer of knowledge based on the premise that development under conditions of peace is only possible when conceived as human development.

Roberto Savio is Chairman of Accademia Panisperna, a cultural meeting space in the centre of Rome, and is President of Arcoiris TV, an online TV channel with the world’s largest collection of videos and registrations of political and cultural events (over 70,000 hours), based in Modena, Italy.

Member of the Executive Committee for Fondazione Italiani, established in Rome, which publishes an online weekly magazine and organizes conferences about global issues.

Member of the  Maurice Strong Sustainability Award Selection Panel, established by the Global Sustainability Forum.

External links
 Roberto Savio's stories published by IPS News
 Other News service
 Roberto Savio's stories on Other News
 Other News Facebook page
 Roberto Savio's Facebook page
 PREMIO SALVADOR ALLENDE A ROBERTO SAVIO

Interviews and Articles
 The ‘Acapulco Paradox’ – Two Parallel Worlds Each Going Their Own Way
 What if Youth Now Fight for Social Change, But From the Right?
 Global governance and common values: the unavoidable debate
 Banks, Inequality and Citizens
 It is now official: the current inter-governmental system is not able to act in the interest of humankind
 Europe has lost its compass
 Ever Wondered Why the World is a Mess?
 Sliding Back to the Victorian Age
 Global Inequality and the Destruction of Democracy
 A Future With No Safety Net? How Brutal Austerity Cuts Are Dismantling the European Dream
 WE NEED BETTER, NOT MORE, INFORMATION

References

Italian journalists
Italian male journalists
Italian activists
University of Parma alumni
Political commentators
Argentine journalists
Male journalists
Living people
Year of birth missing (living people)